Paul Sarauw (30 November 1883 – 24 April 1959) was a Danish screenwriter. He wrote for more than 50 films between 1916 and 1959. He was born and died in Denmark.

Selected filmography

 Skal vi vædde en million? (1932)
 Lalla vinner! (1932)
 Odds 777 (1932)
Prisoner Number One (1935)
 I dag begynder livet (1939)
 Familien Olsen (1940)
 Pas på svinget i Solby (1940)
 Frøken Kirkemus (1941)
 Frk. Vildkat (1942)
 Hans onsdagsveninde (1943)
 Teatertosset ([1944)
 Dolly Takes a Chance (1944)
 Panik i familien (1945)
 De kloge og vi gale (1945)
 Onsdagsväninnan (1946)
 Ved kongelunden... (1953)
 Arvingen (1954)
 Færgekroen (1956)

References

External links

1883 births
1959 deaths
Danish male screenwriters
20th-century screenwriters
People from Copenhagen